NGC 6250 is a young open cluster of stars in the southern constellation of Ara.

References

External links
 
 Simbad
 Image NGC 6250
 http://seds.org/

NGC 6250
6250
Ara (constellation)